Watermelon Creek may refer to:

Watermelon Creek (Georgia)
Watermelon Creek (Anderson County, South Carolina)